Cerioporidae is a family of bryozoans belonging to the order Cyclostomatida.

Genera

Genera:
 Acanthopora d'Orbigny, 1849
 Alveolaria Busk, 1859
 Biflabellaria Pergens, 1894

References

Bryozoan families